The Last Christeros is a 2011 Mexican Western drama film, produced, directed and written by Matías Meyer.

The film premiered at the 2011 Toronto International Film Festival. The film received eight nominations at the 55th Ariel Awards including Best Picture and Best Director for Meyer.

Awards and nominations

References

External links
 
 The Last Christeros on Cineuropa

2011 films
2011 drama films
Mexican drama films
2010s Spanish-language films
2010s Mexican films